Ernesto Espinola (unknown – unknown), was a Paraguayan chess player, two times Paraguayan Chess Championship winner (1940, 1941).

Biography
From the late 1930s to the mid-1940s, Ernesto Espinola was one of Paraguay's leading chess players He twice in row won Paraguayan Chess Championships in 1940 and 1941.

Ernesto Espinola played for Paraguay in the Chess Olympiad:
 In 1939, at second board in the 8th Chess Olympiad in Buenos Aires (+0, =3, -11).

References

External links

Ernesto Espinola chess games at 365chess.com

Year of birth missing
Year of death missing
Paraguayan chess players
Chess Olympiad competitors
20th-century chess players
20th-century Paraguayan people